The National Intercollegiate Rodeo Association (NIRA), based in Walla Walla, Washington, was established in 1949. The NIRA sanctions more than 100 college rodeos every year in the United States, and represents over 3,500 student athletes attending more than 135 member colleges and universities. As well as regional rodeos, the NIRA sanctions the College National Finals Rodeo (CNFR) every June.

Team Champions

Men

Women

See also
Intercollegiate sports team champions

References

External links
National Intercollegiate Rodeo Association
College National Finals Rodeo

Rodeo organizations
Sports organizations established in 1949
Walla Walla, Washington
College sports governing bodies in the United States
College sports in Washington (state)
Companies based in Walla Walla County, Washington